Charlesfield Halt railway station served the village of Charlesfield, Melrose, Scotland, from 1942 to 1961 on the Waverley Route.

History 
The station opened on 10 August 1942 by the LNER. The station is situated to the south of an unnamed minor road. The station was originally intended to be opened for World War 2 workers for the nearby munitions factory where bombs were handled. Production of the bombs ceased after the Second World War and it was used as an armaments store by the Royal Navy Armaments Depot. Use by the Royal Navy ceased in the 1960s and it was then used by West Cumberland Farmers as well as other lesser known farmers for storage and animal husbandry. The station closed in June 1961 to passengers and completely.

References

External links 

Disused railway stations in the Scottish Borders
Former London and North Eastern Railway stations
Railway stations in Great Britain opened in 1942
Railway stations in Great Britain closed in 1961